Hernán Agote (21 July 1937 – 16 October 2017) was an Argentine bobsledder. He competed in the two-man and the four-man events at the 1964 Winter Olympics.

References

External links

1937 births
2017 deaths
Argentine male bobsledders
Olympic bobsledders of Argentina
Bobsledders at the 1964 Winter Olympics
Sportspeople from Buenos Aires